Vanillic acid (4-hydroxy-3-methoxybenzoic acid) is a dihydroxybenzoic acid derivative used as a flavoring agent.  It is an oxidized form of vanillin.  It is also an intermediate in the production of vanillin from ferulic acid.

Occurrence in nature 
The highest amount of vanillic acid in plants known so far is found in the root of Angelica sinensis, an herb indigenous to China, which is used in traditional Chinese medicine.

Occurrences in food 
Açaí oil, obtained from the fruit of the açaí palm (Euterpe oleracea), is rich in vanillic acid.  It is one of the main natural phenols in argan oil.  It is also found in wine and vinegar.

Metabolism 
Vanillic acid is one of the main catechins metabolites found in humans after consumption of green tea infusions.

Synthesis
Oxidation of vanillin to the carboxylic acid occurred in ~88% yield.

References 

Flavors
Dihydroxybenzoic acids
Gallotannins
Vanilloids
Phenol ethers